Actin-related protein 3B also known as ARP3-beta is a protein that in humans is encoded by the ACTR3B gene. Pseudogenes of this gene are located on chromosomes 2, 4, 10, 16, 22 and Y. Alternative splicing results in multiple transcript variants and protein isoforms.

Function 

This gene encodes a member of the actin-related proteins (ARP), which form multiprotein complexes and share 35-55% amino acid identity with conventional actin. The protein encoded by this gene may have a regulatory role in the actin cytoskeleton and induce cell-shape change and motility.

References

External links

Further reading 

 
 
 
 
 

Human proteins
Genes on human chromosome 7